This article contains an overview of the year 1982 in athletics.

International Events
African Championships
Asian Games
Central American and Caribbean Championships
Commonwealth Games
European Championships
European Indoor Championships
World Cross Country Championships

World records

Men

Women

Marlies Göhr (GDR) equals her own world record in the women's 100 metres, clocking 10.88 seconds on 1982-07-06 at a meet in Karl-Marx-Stadt.

Men's Best Year Performers

100 metres

200 metres

400 metres

800 metres

1,500 metres

Mile

3,000 metres

5,000 metres

10,000 metres

Half Marathon

Marathon

110m Hurdles

400m Hurdles

3,000m Steeplechase

High Jump

Long Jump

Triple Jump

Discus

Hammer

Shot Put

Pole Vault

Javelin (old design)

Decathlon

Women's Best Year Performers

100 metres

200 metres

400 metres

800 metres

1,500 metres

Mile

3,000 metres

5,000 metres

10,000 metres

Half Marathon

Marathon

100m Hurdles

400m Hurdles

High Jump

Long Jump

Discus

Shot Put

Javelin (old design)

Heptathlon

Births

January
January 2 – Athanasia Tsoumeleka, Greek race walker
January 3 – Eşref Apak, Turkish hammer thrower
January 5 – Vadims Vasiļevskis, Latvian athlete
January 12 – Dimitrios Tsiamis, Greek triple jumper
January 24 – Hamdi Dhouibi, Tunisian decathlete

February
February 2 – Dorcus Inzikuru, Ugandan athlete
February 7 – Rumyana Karapetrova, Bulgarian javelin thrower
February 8 – Iryna Shtanhyeyeva, Ukrainian sprinter
February 9 – Zersenay Tadese, Eritrean athlete
February 10 – Justin Gatlin, American athlete
February 18 – Krisztián Pars, Hungarian hammer thrower

March
March 1 – Leryn Franco, Paraguayan javelin thrower
March 14 – Yuleidis Limonta, Cuban heptathlete
March 16 – Inga Kožarenoka, Latvian javelin thrower
March 25 – Kayoko Fukushi, Japanese long-distance runner
March 31 – Janice Josephs, South African heptathlete

April
April 15 – Jean-Jacques Nkouloukidi, Italian race walker
April 20 – Arnoud Okken, Dutch middle-distance runner
April 20 – Dennis Leyckes, German decathlete
April 25 – Victoria Mitchell, Australian long-distance runner

May
May 6 – Dilshod Nazarov, Tajikistani hammer thrower
May 10 – Yochai Halevi, Israeli long jumper and triple jumper
May 12 – Marvin Anderson, Jamaican sprinter
May 15 – Veronica Campbell-Brown, Jamaican athlete
May 20 – Mihail Stamatoyiannis, Greek shot putter
May 25 – Ezekiel Kemboi, Kenyan athlete
May 30 – Phaustin Baha Sulle, Tanzanian long-distance runner

June
June 3 – Yelena Isinbayeva, Russian pole vaulter
June 5 – Fabiano Peçanha, Brazilian middle-distance runner
June 11 – Vanessa Boslak, French pole vaulter
June 13 – Kenenisa Bekele, Ethiopian distance runner
June 25 – Esther Dankwah, Ghanaian sprinter

July
July 8 – Park Chil-Sung, South Korean race walker
July 14 – Vyacheslav Muravyev, Kazakhstani sprinter
July 23 – Thaimara Rivas, Venezuelan heptathlete

August
August 5 – Jo Ankier, British long-distance runner
August 9 – Robert Häggblom, Finnish shot putter
August 9 – Byron Piedra, Ecuadorian distance runner
August 31 – Lien Huyghebaert, Belgian athlete

September
September 11 – Elvan Abeylegesse, Ethiopian-born Turkish track and field athlete
September 15 – Matthew Boyles, American race walker
September 29 – Salome Chepchumba, Kenyan middle-distance runner

October
October 25 – Aarik Wilson, American long jumper and triple jumper

November
November 4 – Kamila Skolimowska, Polish hammer thrower (d. 2009)
November 6 – Loree Smith, American hammer thrower
November 9 – Eloise Wellings, Australian long-distance runner
November 11 – Ivan Babaryka, Ukrainian long-distance runner
November 11 – Asafa Powell, Jamaican sprinter
November 29 – Andrei Chubsa, Belarusian high jumper

December
December 2 – Morten Jensen, Danish long jumper
December 11 – Darren Gilford, Maltese athlete
December 25 – Samson Ramadhani, Tanzanian long-distance runner

Deaths
April 26 – Ville Ritola (86), Finnish Olympic gold medal runner (b. 1896)
June 25 – Ed Hamm (76), American athlete (b. 1906)
June 28 – Wiesław Maniak (41), Polish sprinter (b. 1938)
August 4 – Henk van der Wal (95), Dutch track and field athlete (b. 1886)

References
 Year Lists
 Association of Road Racing Statisticians
 Year Rankings

 
Athletics (track and field) by year